A Weary Road is a 1956 Soviet drama film directed by Leonid Gaidai and Valentin Nevzorov. Filmed on the motives of Vladimir Korolenko's Siberian stories.

Plot 
The stationmaster Kruglikov fired at his boss, who wanted him to go along with him as a matchmaker to the supervisor's friend, Raissa, and as a result he was sent to a settlement in Siberia. And suddenly a political exile arrives at the station, which turns out to be the same Raissa.

Cast 
 Sergei Yakovlev as Vasili Kruglikov
 Vladimir Belokurov as Latkin
 Kyunna Ignatova as Raisa Fedoseyeva
 Leonid Gubanov as Dmitri Orestovich
 Nikifor Kolofidin as Vassili's Father
 Aleksandr Antonov as Raissa's Father
 Apollon Yachnitsky as Arabin
 Ivan Ryzhov as gendarme
 Ekaterina Mazurova as Raisa's mother

References

External links 
 

1956 films
Soviet drama films
1950s Russian-language films
1956 drama films
Films directed by Leonid Gaidai
Films based on Russian novels
Mosfilm films
1956 directorial debut films